BDHS may refer to:
 Beaver Dam High School (Beaver Dam, Arizona), United States
 Beaver Dam High School (Wisconsin), Beaver Dam, Wisconsin, United States
 Ben Davis High School, Indianapolis, Indiana, United States
 Bishop Dubois High School, New York, New York, United States
 Bishop Dwenger High School, Fort Wayne, Indiana, United States
 Bradford District High School, Bradford, Ontario, Canada
 Brentsville District High School, Prince William County, Virginia, United States